Magnus Retsius Grødem (born 14 August 1998) is a Norwegian footballer who plays as a midfielder for Eliteserien club Molde.

Club career

Early career
Born in 1998, Grødem started his football career with Bryne FK youth team.

Bryne FK
In 2015, Grødem was called up for Bryne FK first team. On 6 April 2015, Grødem made his Norwegian First Division debut against Nest-Sotra Fotball at Bryne Stadion, replacing Robert Undheim at the 87th minute by coach Gaute Larsen. On 5 July 2015, Grødem scored his first goal in senior team against Fredrikstad FK at the 90+2nd minute. Grødem played 32 games (including a game in Norwegian Football Cup) and scored six goals in league from April 2015 to August 2016.

Vålerenga Fotball
On 17 August 2016, Grødem moved to Vålerenga Fotball. On 7 November 2016, Grødem made his professional league debut in Tippeligaen against Viking FK at Viking Stadion. Grødem was prompted as a starter by coach Kjetil Rekdal and scored a goal at 90th minute. The game finished as 2-0 Vålerenga win.

Vejle BK
On 27 August 2019, Grødem joined Danish 1st Division club Vejle Boldklub on a contract until June 2023. He got shirt number 8.

Molde
On 6 May 2021, Molde announced the signing of Grødem to a three-year contract from Sandnes Ulf.

Career statistics

Club

Honours
Eliteserien: 2022
Norwegian Cup: 2021–22

References

Living people
1998 births
People from Bryne
Norwegian footballers
Norwegian expatriate footballers
Association football midfielders
Norway under-21 international footballers
Norway youth international footballers
Vålerenga Fotball players
Bryne FK players
Ullensaker/Kisa IL players
Vejle Boldklub players
Sandnes Ulf players
Eliteserien players
Norwegian First Division players
Norwegian Second Division players
Norwegian Third Division players
Norwegian expatriate sportspeople in Denmark
Expatriate men's footballers in Denmark
Sportspeople from Rogaland